The 1932 World Table Tennis Championships – Swaythling Cup (men's team) was the sixth edition of the men's team championship.  

Czechoslovakia won the gold medal following a three way play off with Austria and Hungary after all three teams finished with an 8–1 match record. It was the first time that Hungary failed to win the Swaythling Cup.

Swaythling Cup final table

Play Off

See also
List of World Table Tennis Championships medalists

References

-